Anne Claflin (born May 19, 1983) is an American politician and member of the Minnesota House of Representatives. A former member of the Minnesota Democratic–Farmer–Labor Party (DFL), she represented District 54A in the southeastern Twin Cities metropolitan area.

Early life, education, and career
Claflin graduated from South Saint Paul Secondary. She attended Grinnell College, graduating with a Bachelor of Arts in Russian and biology, and the University of Minnesota, graduating with a Master of Science in science, technology, and environmental policy from the Humphrey School of Public Affairs.

Claflin is a research scientist at the Minnesota Pollution Control Agency.

Minnesota House of Representatives
Claflin was elected to the Minnesota House of Representatives in 2018, defeating Republican incumbent Keith Franke.

Personal life
Claflin and her husband, Warren, have one child. She resides in South St. Paul, Minnesota.

References

External links

 Official House of Representatives website
 Official campaign website

Living people
Democratic Party members of the Minnesota House of Representatives
21st-century American politicians
21st-century American women politicians
Women state legislators in Minnesota
1983 births